Fatiha Mejjati (born ) is a Moroccan jihadist. She is the widow of Karim Mejjati, co-founder of the Moroccan Islamic Combatant Group and member of Al-Qaeda. Karim Mejjati is suspected of planning the 2003 Casablanca bombings and the 2004 Madrid train bombings. 

She is a member of ISIL and is believed to be living in Syria. She was designated as a terrorist entity by the Moroccan Ministry of Justice in 2023, and a warrant has been issued for her arrest for alleged terrorist acts.

Biography
Fatiha Mohamed Taher Hassani was born in 1961 to a carpenter father and a housewife mother in Derb Sultan, Casablanca. Hassani had five sisters and a brother. 

She received her Baccalauréat in Literature and Human Sciences in 1980 and received a degree in French private law from Hassan II University of Casablanca in 1985. 

She joined the Moroccan Institute of Management as a management assistant in 1990. Hassani's radicalization began in 1991, as a result of Gulf War, she forced into retirement by the head of the institute for wearing a hijab. Students circulate a petition in support of Hassani, the petition was signed by Karim Mejjati. Fatiha bought Karim, who barely knew Arabic, a French translation of the Quran. They married less than a year later. 
 
The pair had two sons. According to the Morocco World News, Karim Mejjat was the founder of the Moroccan Islamic Combatant Group, which it said owed allegiance to Osama bin Laden. It reports that they moved to Afghanistan, when it was ruled by the Taliban. Foreign Policy reports they moved to Afghanistan in 2001 and 2002.

Her husband Karim is reported to have gone to Saudi Arabia, in 2003, where he served as an Al-Qaeda agent. However, he is also alleged to have planned the 2003 Casablanca bombings, in May 2003. Fatiha and one of her sons were detained by Morocco for several months in Morocco in 2003.

Her husband Karim was also reported to have played a planning role in the 2004 Madrid train bombings. In 2005 he was living in Saudi Arabia again, with one of the pair's sons, when they were killed during a gunfight with Saudi security forces in April, 2005.

France 24 interviewed Fatiha, and published a profile of her, after she published a warning to France that it should be concerned it would be attacked by jihadists. In that interview she denied that she had any ties with al Qaeda, and clarified she did not know of any specific plans to attack France, rather, her warning was based on the perception that, since France sat out the invasion of Iraq in 2003, it had been turning against the Muslim world.

Her surviving son, Ilyas Mejjat, went to work for ISIL's media arm.

After moving to the territory controlled by ISIL she came to lead the Al-Khansaa Brigade, an all-woman unit charged with enforcing the ISIL interpretation of female modesty, proper female attire.

Jeune Afrique reported that she married a senior ISIL leader, in 2014.

References

1961 births
Living people
Moroccan Islamists
Moroccan expatriates in Afghanistan
Moroccan al-Qaeda members
Islamic State of Iraq and the Levant members